Associazione Sportiva Valle Grecanica is an Italian association football club located in Melito di Porto Salvo, Calabria. It currently plays in Eccellenza.

History 
The club was founded in 2010 through the merger of newly promoted Serie D club Omega Bagaladi (based in Bagaladi) and Eccellenza club Melitese (based in Melito di Porto Salvo).

In the season 2011–12 it was relegated to Eccellenza.

Colours 
Its colours are red and yellow.

References

External links
Official homepage

Football clubs in Calabria
Association football clubs established in 2010
2010 establishments in Italy